Jack the Lad were a British folk rock group from North East England formed in 1973.

Jack the Lad may also refer to:

In music 
The Sailor's Hornpipe, also known as The College Hornpipe and Jack's the Lad, a traditional hornpipe melody
JLS, an English boy band whose name stands for "Jack the Lad Swing"
"Jack the Lad", B-side of the Pet Shop Boys 1986 single "Suburbia", also included on the 1986 album Please
"Jack the Lad", a 1988 song by 3 Man Island

As a nickname 
Jack the Lad, the childhood nickname of the English actor Jack O'Connell
"Gentleman Jack" or "Jack the Lad", nickname of Jack Sheppard (1702–1724), a notorious English thief and gaol-breaker of early 18th-century London

Other uses 
"Jack the Lad", a poem by Irish poet Robert Fallon describing Sticky Vicky's stage show

See also
 Jack (magazine), a British lad magazine